Sanshui District, formerly romanized as Samshui, is an urban district of the prefecture-level city of Foshan in Guangdong province, China. It had a population of 622,645 as of the 2010 census. It is known for the "Samsui women", emigrants who labour in Singapore, and for a large fireworks explosion in 2008.

History
According to archaeology sites discovered within the region, there were human beings inhabited in the town of Baini Sanshui District about four thousand years ago.
Samshui was formerly a town which served as the seat of an eponymous county. It was elevated to city status before becoming an urban district of Foshan.

In February 2008, twenty fireworks warehouses exploded in Sanshui.  In total over 15,000 cartons of fireworks were set off over a period of 24 hours.  The loss of inventory was extensive enough that U.S. markets faced real shortages of supply.

Administration divisions
The neighbouring cities, counties and districts are Gaoyao, Dinghu District and Sihui in the west, Qingxin County and Qingyuan in the north, Huadu District and Nanhai District in the east and Gaoming District in the south-west. Sanshui administers 2 subdistricts and 5 towns:

Economy
Oil, coal, and slate are found in the surrounding area. However, Sanshui is also an important producer of food for Guangdong Province, especially fruit. The mainstay of the former city's economy was the Jianlibao Company, which produced a soft drink made from oranges and honey. During the 1990s, Jianlibao was a popular drink throughout China and it even made it into the Hong Kong market. However, embezzlement by the company's senior management has reduced its success. Despite Sanshui's proximity to Guangzhou and other Pearl River Delta cities, it remains a relatively poor place with many people only earning a few hundred yuan a month.

Transportation
Sanshui is on the railway line from Guangzhou to Maoming. The district is served by G15 Shenyang–Haikou Expressway (which provides access to Kaiping and the southern suburbs of Foshan), G55 Erenhot–Guangzhou Expressway (which provides direct access to downtown Guangzhou), China National Highway 321 (which provides access to Zhaoqing) and China National Highway 324.

Climate

Notes

References

External links

 
 

 
County-level divisions of Guangdong
Foshan